Sorenson's Ranch School is a ranch school for struggling youth.  Sorenson's Ranch School is located in Koosharem, Utah. Sorenson's Ranch School is a licensed residential treatment center in the State of Utah.  Sorenson's Ranch School is accredited through the Northwest Accreditation Commission

Sports program
Sorenson's Ranch School offers a sports program.  Students participate in sports with surrounding schools in sports such as basketball, and wrestling.
The Sorenson's Ranch School Mustangs Football Team  also competes with surrounding schools.

School Information

Sorenson's Ranch School is accredited through The Northwest Accreditation Commission    Sorenson's Ranch is also registered with the National Association of Therapeutic Schools and Programs Sorenson's Ranch School is registered with The Joint Commission on Accreditation of Health Care Organizations (JCAHO). The Joint Commission typically is a certification for hospitals; however, the Joint Commission provides accreditation, including deemed status accreditation for several other types of health care organizations in addition to hospitals

Legal issues and abuse
Shaun Sorenson, son of Burnell Sorenson, was the subject of a lawsuit originated by the Utah Department of Health and Human Services due to his employment at the ranch despite his status as a convicted felon in the state of California.  The court ruled that he could in fact remain employed at the school as the law only applied to instructors, and he was not an instructor. 

In 2006, the school filed suit against MySpace, because of past attendees, labeling themselves "survivors", were alleging that the Sorensons engaged in child abuse, employed underqualified staff, and engaged in false advertising.  When the MySpace pages were taken down, they withdrew the suit.

In 2021 the State of Utah took the unusual step of threatening to revoke the license of the school for failing to close a facility known as "Mountain Camp" two years after regulators had ordered them to close it. Mountain Camp employed forced labor as punishment for misbehavior, forcing residents to shovel manure, chop wood, pick up rocks, or simply walk without stopping for hours. Such punishment is considered "disproportionate consequence for negative behaviors” under Utah law. The state's statement on the matter went on to state that the school had failed to report at least a dozen "critical incidents" as required by law, and that staff abused and threatened students.

References

External links
 Sorenson's Ranch School Official Website
 Sorenson's Ranch School Website

Ranch schools
Boarding schools in Utah
Therapeutic boarding schools in the United States
Buildings and structures in Sevier County, Utah
Education in Sevier County, Utah
Private middle schools in Utah
Private high schools in Utah